Martha Alcira Salotti (10 April 1899 – 26 October 1980) was an Argentine educator and writer.

Early life and career
Martha Salotti was born in Buenos Aires on 10 April 1899. She was a National Normal Teacher and a Higher Professor of Natural Sciences, who worked as a kindergarten teacher and then as a grade school teacher for 24 years. From 1957 to 1964, she was director of the prestigious Bernasconi Institute, located in the Parque Patricios neighborhood.

She continued her educational work by organizing teacher improvement courses. Oral narration enjoyed a resurgence in Argentina when she created the Storytellers' Club. She instilled in teachers and students the practice of reading aloud, and oral narration as a contribution to the teaching of language.

Pedagogy
On 10 May 1965, Salotti founded the SUMMA Institute in the Buenos Aires neighborhood of Caballito, together with Dora Pastoriza de Etchebarne. From a kindergarten with six students, it grew to include primary, secondary, and tertiary education. Starting in 1971, the Institute began a teacher training program for Spanish and literature, with a specialization in children's and young adult literature, the first of its kind in Latin America. This followed Salotti's educational philosophy:

Martha Salotti was the student, "spiritual daughter", and inheritor of the pedagogical work of Rosario Vera Peñaloza. After the latter's death, she edited twelve of her scientific texts. The San Martín National Institute presented her its top prize for her work on Credo Patriótico, and an award for a version of Vida del General San Martín adapted for children.

She was dedicated to the production of children's stories, reading books, and pedagogical texts on language teaching. She was also the founding president of the Argentine chapter of the International Board on Books for Young People (IBBY), and a numerary of the American Cultural Union.

She maintained a close friendship with the Chilean poet Gabriela Mistral, and became her representative in Buenos Aires.

Martha Salotti died in Buenos Aires on 26 October 1980.

Legacy
A street is named for her in the Buenos Aires neighborhood of Puerto Madero.

Salotti's educational work is recognized throughout Argentina; sixteen educational establishments in the city of Buenos Aires and in the interior of the country bear her name, and a significant number of classrooms and libraries were named in her honor.

Publications

References

1899 births
1980 deaths
20th-century Argentine educators
Argentine women educators
20th-century Argentine women writers
20th-century Argentine writers
Argentine women children's writers
Writers from Buenos Aires